Killarney Clary is an American poet who was recently awarded a 2011 National Endowment for the Arts Fellowship for Poetry. Her first book, Who Whispered Near Me, was nominated for the Pulitzer Prize. Clary received the Lannan Literary Award for Poetry in 1992.

Biography
Born in 1953 and raised in Pasadena, California, Clary began crafting her unique style of poetry at age 12. She has since been published in numerous publications including: The Boston Review, The Yale Review, American Poetry Review, The Paris Review, and many others. Killarney Clary has published several books of poetry: 
 Who Whispered Near Me (1989),
 By Common Salt (1996),
 Potential Stranger (2003), 
 Shadow of A Cloud but no Cloud (2014).

Clary attended the University of California at Irvine, where she received degrees in studio art and poetry writing. She has taught at the University of California at Irvine and at the University of Iowa Writer's Workshop.

In a review of Who Whispered Near Me, fellow poet Gary Young wrote, "There is no glamour here, little drama. Her subjects are prosaic, but her prose captures the internal rhythms of both memory and casual speech, and has been wrenched into a fierce lyricism. Clary's poetry is a gymnastic of mind. We may feel submerged, lost in someone else's thought, but her poems are maps, and Clary leads us surely through a maze we discover is nothing less than the rich pattern of a life."

References

1954 births
Living people
Poets from California
National Endowment for the Arts Fellows
People from Pasadena, California
University of California, Irvine alumni
University of California, Irvine faculty
Iowa Writers' Workshop faculty
American women poets
20th-century American poets
20th-century American women writers
21st-century American poets
21st-century American women writers